ㅠ (yu) is one of the Korean hangul. The Unicode for ㅠ is U+3160.

Stroke order

Hangul jamo
Vowel letters